Rudolph Martin Singer (1924 – August 18, 2007) was a Canadian football player who played for the Calgary Stampeders. He won the Grey Cup with them in 1948. Pullar previously played football for the Regina Royal Canadian Navy team. He was a veteran of World War II and later worked as an electrician. Singer died of cancer in 2007.

References

1924 births
2007 deaths
Canadian football people from Calgary
Players of Canadian football from Alberta
Calgary Stampeders players
Canadian military personnel of World War II